Abu Sulayman Hamd Ibn Muhammed Ibn Ibrahim al-Khattab al-Khattabi al-Busti, commonly known as Al-Khattabi (c. 319/931 – 388/998), was a Sunni scholar widely regarded as the leading figure in the sciences of Hadith and Shafi'i jurisprudence. He was considered to be one of the most intelligent and authoritative scholars of his time, renowned for his trustworthiness and reliability in transmitting narrations, and the author of a many famous works. Moreover, he was famously known as the man of letters, philologist, and lexicographer, as well as a master in poetry.

Biography

Born
Al-Khattabi was born in Rajab 319 which corresponds to July 931 in Bust (now Lashkargah) which is a city in south of Afghanistan. The name "al-Khattabi" is believed to refer to his great-grandfather, Al-Khattab. It is said that Abu Sulayman al-Khattabi was a descendent of Zayd ibn al-Khattab, a brother of the second caliph, Umar Ibn Al-Khattab.

Education
He studied various sciences through various teachers. He studied philology under Abu Sa'id al-A'rabi, studied Ash'ari theology from al-Gaffal al-Shashi and jurisprudence from Ibn Abi Hurayrash. He studied hadith from Ibn Hibban, Ibn Dasa, Abu al-'Abbas al-Asamm, Abu Bakr al-Najjad, and other hadith experts. He travelled extensively to search for knowledge, education and even trade giving him an earning of living which gave him the ability to visit many places such as Bust, Nishapur, the Hejaz (Mecca and Medina), Basra, Baghdad (where he spent most of his lifetime) and other cities and regions of the eastern Islamic world.

The center of Al-Khattabi's scholarly interest was hadith and jurisprudence. For him to acquire traditions, it is said he studied with leading scholars of his time and as Yaqut states "to have acquired knowledge from many of those possessing it on his various study trips."

Students
Al-Khattabi had a number of students, some of whom achieved prominence in their own right; from them:
 Al-Hakim al-Nishapuri
 Abu Nu'aym al-Isfahani
 Abu Dharr al-Harawi
 Abd al-Ghafir al-Nishapuri
 Abu Ubaydh al-Harawi

Death
During the end of his lifetime, he returned to his hometown, Bust and met with the Sufi monastery where he would join them located right at the Helmand River right near his hometown. He passed away there at the age of 67 on the date of Rabi' al-Akhir 388 which corresponds to April 998.

Creed
In his book entitled Ma'alim al-Sunan, he stated regarding the narrations of the divine Attributes: The people of our time have split into two parties. The first one [The Mu'tazilla and their sub-groups] altogether disavow this kind of hadith and declare them forged outright. This implies their giving the lie to the scholars who have narrated them, that is the imams of our religion and the transmitters of the Prophetic ways, and the intermediaries between us and Allah's Messenger. The second party [Anthropromorphists (Mujassimah) and their sects] give their assent to the narrations and apply their outward meaning literally in a way bordering anthropomorphism and. As for us we steer clear from both views, and accept neither as our school. It is therefore incumbent upon us to seek for these hadiths, when they are cited and established as authentic from the perspectives of transmissions and attributes, as an interpretation derived according to the known meaning of the foundations of the Religion and the schools of the scholars, without rejecting the narration outright, as long as their chains are acceptable narrators are trustworthy.

Legacy
In his three major works on hadith, Al-Khattabi earned his spot in Islamic intellectual history as a major pioneer in the science of hadith studies for his famous works. Ma'alim al-Sunan was the first commentary on Sunan Abi Dawood, one of the six major Sunni collections of Hadith and it is also by far the most referenced in relation to Sunan Abi Dawood by scholars of the past and present. Kitab A'lam al-Sunan fi Sharh Sahih al-Bukhari was the first commentary on Sahih Bukhari, the most important hadith collection within the six major Hadith collections. He authored it shortly after Ma'alim. His commentary on Sahih Bukhari is an original work considered a polemic treatise rather than a neutral commentary. Finally, his work on Gharib al-Hadith represents a major contribution to another field within hadith studies where he scans uncommon and often rare or unique prophetic traditions. His other works have also reached great prominence.

Works
Al-Khattabi's authored many famous scholarly works which include:  
 Sharh Sunan Abi Dawood''' (Expounding on Sunan Abi Dawood), considered the earliest and one of the best commentaries of Sunan Abu Dawood
 Kitab A'lam al-Sunan fi Sharh Sahih al-Bukhari (The Book of Outstanding Examples from the Prophet Traditions: Explaining al-Bukhari's compendium "The Sound Prophet Traditions"), considered the earliest commentary on Sahih Bukhari.
 Kitab al-Uzlat (The Book of Seclusion)
 Gharib al-Hadith (The Difficult Meanings of Hadith), where Al-Dhahabi put on an equal length with Ibn Sallam and Ibn Qutayba's famous works regarding this difficult subject.
 Sharh al-Asma' a-Husna, where Al-Bayhaqi heavily relied on his Al-Asma' wa al-Sifat. 
 Al-Ikhtiyarat al-Fiqhiya, an early work of authority in the Shafi'i school.
 Ma'alim al-Sunan Kitab al-Ghunyah 'anil Kalam wa Ahlih Kitab Islah Ghalat al-Muhadithin Kitab al-Shujaj Kitab al-Jihad Risalat fi i'Jaz al-Qur'an Ilm al-Hadith''

See also 

 List of Ash'aris and Maturidis

References

Sources

Arabic

English

External links
 Abu Sulayman al-Khattabi's page on Goodreads
 Al-Khattabi's Critique of the State of Religious Learning in Tenth-century Islam – University of Göttingen

Shafi'is
Asharis
Hadith scholars
10th-century jurists
931 births
998 deaths